The Stade du Pairay is a football stadium in Seraing, Belgium. It is the home stadium of RFC Seraing. 

Football venues in Wallonia
Sports venues in Liège Province